VA-10 has the following meanings:
Attack Squadron 10 (U.S. Navy)
State Route 10 (Virginia)
Virginia's 10th congressional district
VAIO, a  sub-brand used for many of Sony's computer products.